Assar is a tehsil and sub division in the Doda district of Jammu and Kashmir In 2022, Assar became the part of Doda West Assembly constituency.

References

Villages in Doda district